Dorian may refer to:

Ancient Greece
 Dorians, one of the main ethnic divisions of ancient Greeks
 Doric Greek, or Dorian, the dialect spoken by the Dorians

Art and entertainment

Films
 Dorian (film), the Canadian title of the 2004 film Pact with the Devil
 Dorian Blues, a 2004 film

Literature
 Dorian, an Imitation, a 2002 novel by Will Self
 Dorian, a 1921 novel by Nephi Anderson

Music
 Dorians (band), from Armenia
 Dorian (Spanish band), a Spanish band
 Dorian (Turkish band), a Turkish rock band
 Dorian mode, various musical modes
 Dorian Recordings, a label noted for early music recordings
 Toccata and Fugue in D minor, BWV 538, or "Dorian", an organ piece by Johann Sebastian Bach
 Ukrainian Dorian scale, a musical mode
 "Dorian," a song by Demons and Wizards on their album Touched by the Crimson King

People 
 Dorian (name), a given name (includes a list of people with the name)
 Dorian (rapper) (born 1984), American hip-hop artist, songwriter and music producer

Other uses 
 Dorian Society, a homosexual club
 KH-10 Dorian, a proposed U.S. surveillance satellite
 Hurricane Dorian, a 2019 Category 5 Atlantic hurricane
 Tropical Storm Dorian, a 2013 Atlantic tropical storm

See also 
 Dorian Gray (disambiguation)
 The Picture of Dorian Gray (disambiguation)
 Doric (disambiguation)
 Dorina
 Dorrian
 Dorrien